West Campus Cogeneration Facility is a natural gas fired, electrical power station located in Madison, Wisconsin in Dane County. The facility is owned jointly by Madison Gas and Electric and the University of Wisconsin-Madison, with Madison Gas and Electric operating and maintaining the facility. It provides electricity to Madison Gas and Electric, and steam heat and chilled-water air-conditioning to the University of Wisconsin-Madison campus.

See also
List of power stations in Wisconsin

References

External links
West Campus Cogeneration Facility

Energy infrastructure completed in 2005
Buildings and structures in Dane County, Wisconsin
Natural gas-fired power stations in Wisconsin
Oil-fired power stations in Wisconsin